Methoxyeugenol is a naturall occurring phenylpropene and eugenol derivative. It is found in toxic Japanese star anise pericarp and leaves. as well as in nutmeg crude extract but not in nutmeg essential oil. It also activates PPAR-gamma in vivo.

See also 
 Acetyleugenol

References 

Phenylpropenes
Phenylpropanoids
Secondary metabolites
Methoxy compounds